Paromola is a genus of crabs within the family Homolidae.

Species 

 Paromola bathyalis 
 Paromola crosnieri 
 Paromola cuvieri 
 Paromola japonica 
 Paromola macrochira 
 Paromola rathbuni 
 † Paromola vetula

References 

Dromiacea